Master of the Mountain is the thirteenth season of the computer-animated Ninjago television series  (titled Ninjago: Masters of Spinjitzu before the eleventh season). The series was created by Michael Hegner and Tommy Andreasen. The season aired from 13 September to 25 October 2020, following the twelfth season titled Prime Empire. It is succeeded by The Island.

The thirteenth season follows the ninja as they travel to the fictional kingdom of Shintaro. The focus of the season is the ninja character Cole as he discovers the dungeons that lie beneath Shintaro Mountain. The season introduces two tribes named the Geckles and the Munce who dwell in the mountain and the season's main antagonist named the Skull Sorcerer. The season finale ends with Cole unlocking a new ability that is described as the "Spinjitzu Burst" and defeating the Skull Sorcerer, reavealed to be Shintaro's ruler, King Vangelis.

Voice cast

Main 

 Sam Vincent as Lloyd Garmadon, the Green Ninja
 Vincent Tong as Kai, the red ninja, the Elemental Master of Fire, and Nya's brother
 Michael Adamthwaite as Jay, the blue ninja and Elemental Master of Lightning
 Brent Miller as Zane, the white ninja and Elemental Master of Ice
 Kirby Morrow as Cole, the black ninja and Elemental Master of Earth
 Kelly Metzger as Nya, the Elemental Master of Water and Kai's sister
 Paul Dobson as Sensei Wu, the wise teacher of the ninja
 Deven Mack as King Vangelis/the Skull Sorcerer/Korgran's Axe
 Sabrina Pitre as Princess Vania

Supporting 

Michael Adamthwaite as the Skull of Hazza D'Ur/Murt
 Brian Drummond as Hailmar/Gleck/Mino
 Tabitha St Germain as Queen Murtessa
 Andrew McNee as Chancellor Gulch
 Ian James Corlett as Fungus
 Paul Dobson as Korgran
 Adam Trask as Plundar
 Kathleen Barr as Misako
 Jennifer Hayward as P.I.X.A.L. a female nindroid
 Bill Newton as Gliff
 Peter New as Groko
 Sabrina Pitre as Garpo
 Tabitha St Germain as Ginkle
 Mark Oliver as Korgran's father
 Erin Mathews as Lilly

Release 
The season was first revealed in a 30-second teaser trailer, which was released on the Lego YouTube channel on 17 June 2020. This was followed by an official trailer on 22 June 2020. Master of the Mountain premiered on Cartoon Network on 13 September 2020 with the release of the first episode titled Shintaro. The subsequent episodes were released throughout September and October 2020.

Plot 
The Ninja and Master Wu are invited to the Kingdom of Shintaro. They meet King Vangelis and his daughter Vania, who takes an interest in Cole. That night, a Geckle enters Cole's room, who discovers that the creature has his mother's necklace. Vania takes Cole to a secret entrance that leads into the Dungeons of Shintaro. They discover the Geckles and the Munce, two tribes forced to work in the mines by the evil Skull Sorcerer, but Cole is taken prisoner.

Vania leads the ninja to the dungeons, but they are captured by the Awakened Warriors, who can be revived by the sorcerer's Skull of Hazza D'ur. One of the Geckles tells Cole about the Blades of Deliverance, which were wielded by a warrior named "Gilly" who freed the tribes from a dragon called Grief-Bringer. The theft of the blades caused a rift between the two tribes. The ninja escape and free the tribes. They split up, with Kai and Zane taking a tunnel with the Geckles, and Lloyd, Jay and Nya taking another tunnel with the Munce. Cole is forced to take a different tunnel by the Skull Sorcerer.

Nya, Jay, and Lloyd meet the Queen of the Munce, Murtessa, who takes a liking to Jay. Murtessa challenges Nya to a duel, who wins and becomes Queen of the Munce. Meanwhile, Kai and Zane are accused by Geckle Chancellor Gulch of working for the Skull Sorcerer and are forced to undergo a "Trial by Mino". After winning the trial, Kai and Zane notice Gleck is wearing Cole's necklace. They realise that "Gilly" was Cole's mother Lilly. Gulch resigns as Chancellor and gives the position to Kai.

Vania decides to go after Cole and saves him from giant spiders. They return to the surface and inform Wu about the ninjas' predicament. They consult King Vangelis, but he reveals that he is the Skull Sorcerer. Vangelis presses a button that opens a trap door and Cole, Wu and Vania fall into the abyss. After a safe landing at Rock-Bottom, Wu, Cole, and Vania are met by Fungus, Korgran and Plundar who call themselves "The Lowly". They reveal that they were sent to retrieve the skull but Vangelis banished them to Rock-Bottom. Cole decides to change the team name to "The Upply". The Upply, Cole, Wu and Vania discover the Heart of the Mountain, a legendary temple of the Masters of Earth. Wu explains to Cole the teaching of the Spinjitzu Burst, who then finds and operates a mech to return the group to the surface. 

Nya and Kai lead the tribes to a peace meeting, but are ambushed by the undead dragon, Grief-Bringer, who forces the tribes to flee into a Strong-Cave. Pursued by a magma monster, Cole, Princess Vania, Wu & the Lowly arrive at a mysterious temple deep in Shintaro Mountain, a temple which was once a training ground for Earth Elementals including Cole's own mother, Lilly!   The Skull Sorcerer tricks Lloyd into believing that the Munce and Geckles can go free, but he enslaves them and the ninja are captured. Cole, the Lowly, Princess Vania and Wu discover that the stone-mech is fueled by Elemental Power, and attach it to the mine-carts in an effort to blast their way out of the mountain to confront the evil Skull Sorcerer!  Cole and the Upply arrive at the Skull Sorcerer's Keep and find the ninja locked into cages. The Geckles and Munce have been put back to work in the chain-gang, mining Vengestone. Cole and his crew venture underground to fight the Skull Sorcerer. Cole confronts him with the Blades of Deliverance, but discovers that they are powerless. He has a flashback of his mother Lilly, which unlocks the Spinjitzu Burst and destroys the Skull, awakened warriors and Grief-Bringer. Vania arrives with Wu and the Winged Guards of Shintaro, who arrest Vangelis and crown Vania as Queen of Shintaro.

Episodes

Accolades 
In 2021, Master of the Mountain was nominated for the Leo Awards for Best Direction of an Animated Series for the episode Son of Lilly.

References

Primary

Secondary 

Master of the Mountain
2020 Canadian television seasons
2020 Danish television seasons